The Five Frankfurters is a 1922 German silent historical film directed by Erich Schönfelder. It was based on a 1912 play of the same title about the rise of the Rothschild family.

The film's sets were designed by the art directors Rudi Feld and Robert Neppach.

Cast

References

External links

1920s historical films
German historical films
German silent feature films
Films of the Weimar Republic
Films directed by Erich Schönfelder
Films set in the 19th century
Films set in Frankfurt
Rothschild family
German black-and-white films
Films about Jews and Judaism
1920s German films